Kurt Magnus (September 8, 1912 -  December 12, 2003) was a German scientist, expert in the field of applied mechanics, a pioneer of mechatronics, modern navigation technology and inertial sensors.

Kurt Magnus earned his doctorate in 1937 from the Georg-August University in Göttingen in the field of "force-coupled gyroscopes". In 1942 Magnus habilitated on the subject of "General movements of rigid bodies in moving reference systems".

By the end of World War II during the Soviet Operation Osoaviakhim (a secret operation, which was part of the Soviet WWII reparations), on October 22 1946 he was shipped to the Soviet Union where he worked until 1953 at a secret facility codenamed NII-88 (NII stands in Russian for research&development institute) at its branch located on the Gorodomlya Island on Lake Seliger in Tver Oblast. 

Awards
Ludwig Prandtl Ring
Wilhelm Exner Medal
Bavarian Maximilian Order for Science and Art
Grashof Medal of the Association of German Engineers
 On July 18, 2018 a Memorial plaque for Prof. Kurt Magnus was unveiled in the Faculty of Mechanical Engineering at the Technical University of Munich

References

1912 births
2003 deaths
German mechanical engineers
German physicists